Nuvvus is a village on the Finland–Norway border on the Deatnu river.

Villages in Finland
Utsjoki